Michael Henry Taylor (1918-2005) was a male swimmer who competed for England.

Swimming career
Taylor represented England and won a gold medal in the 330 yard medley relay and a bronze medal in the 110 yard backstroke at the 1938 British Empire Games in Sydney, New South Wales, Australia.

Personal life
During the Games in 1938 he lived at Abbey Lane, Sheffield and was a solicitor's clerk by trade.

References

1918 births
2005 deaths
English male swimmers
Boxers at the 1938 British Empire Games
Commonwealth Games medallists in swimming
Commonwealth Games gold medallists for England
Commonwealth Games bronze medallists for England
Medallists at the 1938 British Empire Games